Geny Rebello (born 1927) is a grandmaster of Brazilian Jiu-Jitsu holding a 9th degree red belt. In 1997, Jiu-Jitsu Federation of Rio de Janeiro held a tournament named  in commemoration of his 70th anniversary.

See also
List of Brazilian Jiu-Jitsu practitioners

References

Brazilian practitioners of Brazilian jiu-jitsu
People awarded a red belt in Brazilian jiu-jitsu
People from Teresópolis
Possibly living people
1927 births
Sportspeople from Rio de Janeiro (state)